Operation: Livecrime (stylized as Operation: LIVEcrime) is a boxed set, covering the live performance of the album Operation: Mindcrime by the American heavy metal band Queensrÿche. It was released by EMI in 1991. After Queensrÿche toured in 1991 in support of Empire, record label EMI released this limited-edition set in two versions, one containing both a videocassette and a CD, the other containing both a videocassette and an audio cassette of live Operation: Mindcrime performances.

In 2001 the CD was re-mastered, with the rest of the Queensrÿche catalog following in 2003. The video was also re-released as a DVD, with the hidden bonus tracks "The Lady Wore Black" and "Roads to Madness", interviews and a graphic story of the album.

Track listing

Personnel
Band members
Geoff Tate – lead vocals, keyboards on "Anarchy-X," "The Mission," and "Eyes of a Stranger"
Michael Wilton – guitar, backing vocals, acoustic guitar on "The Mission," "Waiting for 22," and "My Empty Room"
Chris DeGarmo – guitar, backing vocals, keyboards on "Eyes of a Stranger"
Eddie Jackson – bass, backing vocals
Scott Rockenfield – drums

Additional musician
Pamela Moore – vocals

Production
Wayne Isham - director
Jeff Tannebring - producer
Tom Hall - live recording
James 'Jimbo' Barton - mixing

Charts

Certifications - video

References

1991 live albums
1991 video albums
Queensrÿche live albums
EMI Records live albums
Queensrÿche video albums
EMI Records video albums
Live video albums